Edward Lambe Parsons (May 18, 1868 – July 19, 1960) was the third bishop of the Episcopal Diocese of California.

Early Life and Education
Born on May 18, 1868 in New York City to Arthur Wellesley parsons and Helen Clement White, Parsons was raised as a Presbyterian. He was educated at Yale College from where he completed his Bachelor of Arts in 1889 with the intention of becoming a lawyer. However, he attended the Union Theological Seminary to undertake theological studies from where he graduated in 1892. Despite his studies he was application to become a Presbyterian minister was rejected. This led to his consultations with Bishop   William Lawrence which eventually led him to join the Episcopal Church and study at the Episcopal Theological School, from where he graduated in 1894.

Ordained Ministry
He was ordained to the diaconate on December 23, 1894 by Bishop William Lawrence of Massachusetts, and to the priesthood on June 9, 1895 by Bishop Henry C. Potter of New York. He was initially assistant at Grace Church in New York City from 1894 to 1895. In 1896 he moved to California to serve as rector of Trinity Church in Menlo Park, California. Between 1900 and 1904 he was rector of St Matthew's Church in San Mateo, California, while in 1904 he became rector of St Mark's Church in Berkeley, California, where he remained until 1919.

Episcopacy 
Parsons was elected on the third ballot to be coadjutor bishop of the Diocese of California and was consecrated on November 5, 1919 by Bishop William Ford Nichols of California. He then succeeded as diocesan bishop on June 5, 1924 and remained in office until his retirement on December 31, 1940. After retiring from his position with the church, he joined the Northern California American Civil Liberties Union board of directors, serving as chairman from 1941 to 1956 and remaining on the board for the rest of his life.

He was a member of the University Club of San Francisco. He was an author of several books including The American Prayer Book: Its Origins and Principles (1937). He married Bertha de Forest Brush on May 18, 1897, and had four children. He died in San Francisco in 1960, at age 92.

References

1868 births
1960 deaths
Yale College alumni
People from the San Francisco Bay Area
Episcopal bishops of California
Converts to Anglicanism from Presbyterianism